Syse's Cabinet was a minority centre-right Conservative, Centre, Christian Democrat Government of Norway. It succeeded the Labour Second cabinet Brundtland after the 1989 election, and sat between 16 October 1989 and 3 November 1990. It was replaced by the Labour Third cabinet Brundtland after Centre left the coalition due to disagreement over possible Norwegian membership in the European Economic Area. This disagreement was anticipated as the cabinet operated with a suicide paragraph from the beginning. Syse's cabinet had the following composition:

Cabinet members

|}

See also
 Norwegian Council of State
 Government of Norway
 List of Norwegian governments

Notes

References 

Syse
Syse
Syse
Syse
1989 establishments in Norway
1990 disestablishments in Norway
Cabinets established in 1989
Cabinets disestablished in 1990